The Iran Broadcasting University (Dāneshgāh-e Sedā va Simā) formerly known as the Iran Broadcasting College (Dāneshkade-ye Sedā va Simā) is a public university in Tehran, Iran. It is affiliated to I.R.I.B and also has campuses in Qom.

History
The first name of the institution was the Technical Training Center, which was later changed to IRIB University. In 1982 diplomas in production were promoted to bachelor's degrees and in 1995 and 1996 degrees in technical engineering and film production were added. In 1997 a communications degree was created to join academic disciplines.

IRIB also established a broadcasting school in Qom in 1997 which teaches up to a degree level.

Faculties
Faculty of TV & Radio Productions
Majors: TV Directing(Dramatic and Documentary), Producers(Dramatic and Documentary), Radio(Writer and Producer), Playing international Instrument
Faculty of Broadcast Engineering
Majors: Electrical Technician(Sound and Video and Transmitter), Electrical Engineering, Sound Engineering
Faculty of Communication
Majors: Communication(News and Radio), Research in the Communication, Advertising and Marketing, Radio and TV Journalism
Faculty of Digital Arts
Majors: TV and Digital Arts(Graphic and Animation)
Faculty of Philosophy and Media
Majors: Media Management, Religion and Media, Dramatic Literature 
Faculty of Media Applied Science and Technology
Majors: Media, Sound, IT, Media Relations, Journalism, Animation, cinematography, Film Production, Financial Accounting, Cultural Affairs, Codification, Media Engineering, IT in Media Engineering

Events 
1st Conference on Broadcast Engineering 2005
2nd Conference on Broadcast Engineering 2007
3rd Conference on Broadcast Engineering 2009
4th Conference on Broadcast Engineering 2011

Notable alumni

References

External links 
 Iran Broadcasting University website

1969 establishments in Iran
Islamic Republic of Iran Broadcasting
Film schools in Iran
Universities in Tehran
Educational institutions established in 1969
Mass media in Tehran
Universities in Iran